Jaroslav Papiernik (February 14, 1952 in Hriňová – April 26, 2002 in Považská Bystrica) was a Czechoslovak/Slovak handball player who competed in the 1976 Summer Olympics. In 1976 he was part of the Czechoslovak team which finished seventh in the Olympic tournament. He played all five matches and scored five goals. 1 day before the final match of his club in the play-off for the champion of Slovakia, he committed suicide by hanging, aged 50.

References

1952 births
2002 deaths
Czechoslovak male handball players
Slovak male handball players
Olympic handball players of Czechoslovakia
Handball players at the 1976 Summer Olympics
People from Detva District
Sportspeople from the Banská Bystrica Region